Copeland is an unincorporated community in the Rockford Township of Surry County, North Carolina, United States.

Geography
The community is centered on the intersection of Stony Knoll Road and Copeland School Road/Double Creek Road and generally lies near the head of East Double Creek .  Copeland has an elevation of 1,172 feet above sea level.  Area landmarks near the center of the community include Copeland Elementary School, the local masonic lodge, Ruritan club, and area churches.

References

External links
 Copeland Elementary School

Unincorporated communities in Surry County, North Carolina
Unincorporated communities in North Carolina